Thomas Hardmeier (born 16 February 1965) is a Swiss cinematographer.  His credits include 22 Bullets, Yves Saint Laurent, A Butterfly Kiss and Accomplices. In 2014, he won the award for Best Cinematography at the César Awards and the Lumières Awards for the film The Young and Prodigious T.S. Spivet.

Hardmeier was born in Zürich.

Filmography 
 2010 : Small World

External links
 

1966 births
Swiss cinematographers
Film people from Zürich
Living people